The Order of Corporate Reunion (OCR), officially the Christian, Ecumenical, and Fraternal Order of Corporate Reunion, is an ecumenical association of clergy and laity of Anglican origin. The OCR was founded by Frederick George Lee, Thomas Wimberley Mossman, and John Thomas Seccombe between 1874-1877 in London. Established as an Anglo-Papalist society to continue the work of the Association for the Promotion of the Unity of Christendom, its founders sought to restore an apostolic succession recognized by the Catholic Church through reordinations as a means for reunion.

The founders of the Order of Corporate Reunion claimed to have been consecrated as bishops by Roman Catholic bishops. However, they did not state in public the names of their consecrators; over a century after their deaths it was revealed that cardinals Luigi Nazari di Calabiana, Domenico Agostini, and Vincenzo Moretti allegedly consecrated Lee and Mossman.

Following the deaths of its founders, the order fell dormant with its apostolic succession maintained, and initially revived in 1912. Prominent members and leaders of the revived order were believed to have included Arnold Harris Mathew, Hugh George de Willmott Newman, and Peter Paul Brennan. This revived Order of Corporate Reunion, upon the death of Brennan, schismed into at least three separate bodies, though the organization incorporated by Brennan and others included Michael Kline as the disputed successive primate.

History 
Following the dissolution of the Association for the Promotion of the Unity of Christendom, the OCR was established in response to Apostolicae curae, which declared all Anglican ordinations "absolutely null and utterly void". During the latter 19th and early 20th centuries, numerous Anglican clergy obtained conditional ordination (reordination) by bishops in the order, with the aim of receiving holy orders recognized as valid by the Roman Catholic Church. Most of these OCR ordinations occurred in secret, though information about some became public; Richard Williams Morgan and Charles Isaac Stevens were both consecrated within the Order of Corporate Reunion on 6 March 1879. Morgan had been previously consecrated by Jules Ferrette.

In 1912, the order was revived and allegedly involved the membership of Arnold Harris Mathew of the Old Roman Catholic Church in Great Britain and Hugh George de Willmott Newman of the Catholicate of the West. From its revival, it became dormant again with the death of Mathew until its growth in the United States. In 1998, a new branch of the order was established by Diederik Quatannens; his leadership was succeeded by Bertil Persson. After Persson's retirement, the order was then led by Archbishop Peter Paul Brennan of the Old Catholic Confederation, who died in 2016.

After Brennan's death, Michael Kline of the Exorcist Order of Saint Michael in Missouri was entrusted to be Brennan's successor as leader of the OCR, who alongside Persson and Brennan incorporated the OCR within the United States; during his tenure, the Order of Corporate Reunion schismed into at least three bodies. Upon the resignation of Kline as Primate of the OCR, Richard Cumming was appointed the Prime Bishop or Universal Primate of the Order of Corporate Reunion in 2022.

See also
John Edward Bazille-Corbin

References

Religious organizations
1877 establishments in England
Anglican organizations established in the 19th century
Anglo-Catholicism
Catholic–Protestant ecumenism
Church of England societies and organisations
Religious organizations established in 1877
Christian ecumenical organizations